Renia factiosalis, the dark-banded renia or sociable renia moth, is a litter moth of the family Erebidae. The species was first described by Francis Walker in 1859. It is found from southern Canada to Florida and Texas.

The wingspan is about 24 mm. Adults are on wing from May to September. There is one generation in the north-east, two generations in Missouri and multiple generations in the south.

The larvae feed on organic matter, including dead leaves.

References

Herminiinae
Moths of North America
Moths described in 1859